De vrouw Clasina  is a 1915 Dutch silent drama film directed by Maurits Binger.

Cast
Louis H. Chrispijn	 ... 	Schipper / Bargee
Annie Bos	... 	Dochter van de schipper / Bargee's Daughter
Esther De Boer-van Rijk	... 	Vrouw van de schipper / Bargee's Wife
Koba Kinsbergen	... 	Jongere dochter van de schipper / Bargee's Younger Daughter
Jan van Dommelen		
Christine van Meeteren		(as Christine Chrispijn-van Meteren)
Mathilde Kiehl		
Willem van der Veer		
Coen Hissink	
John Timrott	
Jan C. De Vos		
Willem Faassen

References

External links 
 

1915 films
Dutch silent feature films
Dutch black-and-white films
1915 drama films
Films directed by Maurits Binger
Dutch drama films
Silent drama films